The 2004 Southern Conference baseball tournament was held at Joseph P. Riley Jr. Park in Charleston, South Carolina, from May 26 through 30. Third seeded  won the tournament and earned the Southern Conference's automatic bid to the 2004 NCAA Division I baseball tournament. It was the Bulldogs seventh SoCon tournament win.

The top eight baseball programs in the conference participated in the double-elimination tournament. Furman, Wofford, and Appalachian State were not in the field. College of Charleston claimed its first top seed by winning its first regular season championship.

Seeding

Bracket

All-Tournament Team

References 

Tournament
Southern Conference Baseball Tournament
SoCon baseball tournament
Southern Conference baseball tournament